Nicolás Dionisio Castellanos Rivero (December 6, 1911 in Limonar, Cuba – February 10, 1985) was a Cuban politician and mayor of Havana from 1947 to 1952. Castellanos was the president of the Havana City Council until succeeding Manuel Fernández Supervielle as mayor. He was a member of the Authentic Party when taking the mayoral position. He was married to Laudelina Fernández Castellanos and had three children. Castellanos and his family left Cuba after the Cuban Revolution.

Mayor of Havana
Castellanos took office in 1947 after the mayor, Manuel Fernández Supervielle, committed suicide. When Castellanos took office Havana's main issue was a lack of water. Castellanos allocated 26 million pesos to complete the third expansion  of Acueducto de Albear. He ran for a second term in 1950, using his accomplishments of solving Havana's water issues as the focus of his campaign, causing the election to be termed "The Bathtub Election". He won the nomination over his opponent, Antonio Prío Socarrás, with 171,828 votes to 119,555.

Visit to Key West
In 1951, then mayor, Castellanos, had an official visit to Key West, Florida with his wife Laudelina "Lila" Fernandez Castellanos. They arrived on February 24 and were greeted by C.B. Harvey, then mayor of Key West, and his wife Wilhelmina Harvey. 
 This visit was important as Cuba and The United States faced political troubles, with Havana and Key West having only 105 miles of separation.

References 

1911 births
1985 deaths
Mayors of places in Cuba
20th-century Cuban politicians
Cuban emigrants to the United States